Canton Lake may refer to:

Canton Lake (Oklahoma), lake in Blaine and Dewey counties in Oklahoma
Canton Lake (Illinois), freshwater reservoir in Fulton County, Illinois